Ashland is a city in and the county seat of Ashland County, Ohio, United States, 66 miles southwest of Cleveland and 82 miles northeast of Columbus. The population was 20,362 at the 2010 census. It is the center of the Ashland Micropolitan Statistical Area (as defined by the United States Census Bureau in 2003).

Ashland was designated a Tree City USA by the National Arbor Day Foundation in 1984.

History
Ashland was laid out by Daniel Carter in 1815. Ashland was originally called Uniontown, but in 1822 the city was compelled to adopt a new name because another city in Ohio was already named Uniontown. The new name of Ashland was selected by supporters of the Kentucky congressman Henry Clay, from Ashland, his estate near Lexington. Later, "Henry Clay High School" was considered as a name for what is now known as Ashland High School.

In the mid-1800s, Ashland pioneers traveled to Oregon, naming a settlement after the town. In 1878, with financial assistance from the city, the German Baptist Brethren Church opened Ashland College. Ashland became an early center of manufacturing in Ohio. In 1870, brothers Francis E. Myers and Philip A. Myers went into business selling farm equipment and operating a repair shop. They secured the patent for a double-action pump that delivered water in a steady stream rather than spurts. By 1915, F.E. Myers & Bro. had 800 workers. Myers was the largest of the 47 factories in Ashland at that time. Other factories included Reliable Match Co. ("Strike Anywhere Matches"), Kauffman Mfg. Co. (manufacturer of folding chairs used in Union Army encampments), Dr. Hess & Clark (veterinary supplies and disinfectants) and T.W. Miller's Faultless Rubber Co. (rubber sundries, surgical goods and bicycle tires).

In 1912, Harry Ross Gill, an Ashland native, invented the way to make cigar-shaped balloons (until then they were only round). He started the Eagle Rubber Company in 1913 and the National Latex company in 1929. The industry that Gill developed in Ashland led to the city becoming known as "the balloon capital of the world." Ashland still celebrates its balloon heritage with its annual BalloonFest.

Geography
Ashland is at  (40.867016, -82.315146).

The city has  of streets, one hospital, two fire stations, one police station, and five parks.

Demographics

2010 census
As of the census of 2010, the city had 20,362 people, 8,063 households, and 4,813 families. The city's racial makeup was 95.8% White, 1.4% African American, 0.1% Native American, 1.0% Asian, 0.1% Pacific Islander, 0.3% from other races, and 1.3% from two or more races. Hispanic or Latino of any race were 1.2% of the population.

There were 8,063 households, of which 28.2% had children under the age of 18 living with them, 43.2% were married couples living together, 12.1% had a female householder with no husband present, 4.4% had a male householder with no wife present, and 40.3% were non-families. 34.2% of all households were made up of individuals, and 15.9% had someone living alone who was 65 years of age or older. The average household size was 2.28 and the average family size was 2.91.

The city's median age was 36.1 years. 21% of the city's population was under age 18; 15.7% was from age 18 to 24; 22.5% was from age 25 to 44; 23.1% was from age 45 to 64; and 17.7% was age 65 or older. The city's gender makeup was 46.8% male and 53.2% female.

2000 census
As of the census of 2000, the city had 21,249 people, 8,327 households, and 5,262 families. The population density was 2,051.5 people per square mile (791.9/km). There were 8,870 housing units at an average density of 856.4/sq mi (330.6/km). The city's racial makeup was 96.35% White, 1.19% African American, 0.13% Native American, 1.05% Asian, 0.05% Pacific Islander, 0.32% from other races, and 0.91% from two or more races. Hispanic or Latino of any race were 0.85% of the population.

There were 8,327 households, of which 29.1% had children under the age of 18 living with them, 48.3% were married couples living together, 11.4% had a female householder with no husband present, and 36.8% were non-families. 31.8% of all households were made up of individuals, and 13.8% had someone living alone who was 65 years of age or older. The average household size was 2.32 and the average family size was 2.92.

22.6% of the city's population was under age 18, 15.4% was from age 18 to 24, 25.1% was from age 25 to 44, 20.3% was from age 45 to 64, and 16.6% was age 65 or older. The median age was 35 years. For every 100 females, there were 87.2 males. For every 100 females age 18 and over, there were 82.0 males.

The city's median household income was $34,250, and the median family income was $42,755. Males had a median income of $33,634 versus $21,781 for females. The city's per capita income was $16,760. About 7.9% of families and 10.5% of the population were below the poverty line, including 13.7% of those under age 18 and 9.1% of those age 65 or over.

Government
The city is governed by a mayor, Matt Miller, and a five-person city council.

Transportation
The Ashland County Airport is three nautical miles (3.5 mi, 5.6 km) northeast of Ashland's central business district.

Education

The Ashland City School District enrolls 3,192 students in public primary and secondary schools as of the 2017–18 school year. The district operates five schools, including three elementary schools, one middle school, one high school. The city is also home to Ashland Christian School, St. Edward Catholic School, and Ashland Montessori School.

The city is home to Ashland University and Ashland Theological Seminary. Both were established by the Brethren Church—an Evangelical Protestant church in the Anabaptist tradition—which is headquartered in Ashland.

Ashland contains the Ashland Public Library.

Notable people
	

 William B. Allison, politician who represented Iowa in the U.S. House of Representatives and U.S. Senate
 Rolla Kent Beattie, botanist
 Jessica Canseco, ex-wife of former baseball player José Canseco
 Ernest Cline, screenwriter
 Mary Hannah Fulton, medical missionary in China
 Frank John William Goldsmith, survivor of the sinking of the Titanic
 Joseph F. Holson, toxicologist and President of WIL Research Laboratories
 James P. Latta, U.S. Representative from Nebraska
 Ronnie Martin, musician
 Fred Martinelli, college football head coach, member of College Football Hall of Fame
 Joseph D. Moody, president of the Southern California Dental Association and president of the Historical Society of Southern California
 Eric Musselman, professional basketball coach in the National Basketball Association (NBA)
 Thomas F. Olin, Chairman of Archway Cookies, Incorporated. (Named Ashland, Ohio's first "Citizen of the Year" in 1991)
 Tim Richmond, NASCAR driver, Indianapolis 500 Rookie of the year
 John Roseboro, professional baseball player in Major League Baseball
 Edmund G. Ross, politician who served as a U.S. Senator representing Kansas from 1866 to 1871 and Governor of the New Mexico Territory from 1885 to 1889
 Tim Seder, professional football player in the National Football League (NFL)
 Robert C. Springer, astronaut
 Alfred P. Swineford, Member of the Michigan House of Representatives from 1871 to 1872
 Matt Underwood, TV play-by-play announcer for the Cleveland Guardians
 Ron Zook, college football head coach; assistant coach in the NFL

References

External links

 City website
 

 

 
Cities in Ohio
Cities in Ashland County, Ohio
County seats in Ohio
1815 establishments in Ohio
Populated places established in 1815